Augustyn is both a surname and a given name. Notable people with the name include:

Surname
Błażej Augustyn (born 1988), Polish footballer 
Brian Augustyn (born 1954), American comic book editor and writer
Frank Augustyn (born 1953), Canadian ballet dancer
Irena Lichnerowicz-Augustyn (born 1974), Polish civil servant, diplomat
Joe Augustyn, American screenwriter, film producer, and author
John-Lee Augustyn (born 1986), South African cyclist
 Marcjanna M Augustyn, Polish economist, Bournemouth University professor
Urszula Augustyn (born 1964), Polish politician
Veronica Augustyn, American materials scientist

Given name
Augustyn Bloch
Augustyn Józef Czartoryski
Augustyn Kordecki
Augustyn Mirys

See also
Hieronim Augustyn Lubomirski